The West African Games was an international multi-sport event between the nations of West Africa, which was held in Lagos, Nigeria in 1977. Opened on 27 August by Nigeria's head of state, Olusegun Obasanjo, ten countries took part in the eight-day competition. A total of eleven sports were contested.

The competition was also called the ECOWAS Games on account of all participating nations being from the Economic Community of West African States, founded in Lagos two years earlier. It was organised by the ECOWAS Games Council headed by Dan Isokrari. During the games, a second edition to be held in 1979 in Cotonou, Benin was announced, though this did not come to pass.

Some sources referred to this competition as the second West African Games, in light of a previous event organised in 1960.

Sports

Participating nations

See also 
 African Games
 Central African Games (inactive)
 South African Games (now defunct)

References

African international sports competitions
International sports competitions hosted by Nigeria
International sports competitions in Lagos
Sport in West Africa
Defunct multi-sport events
Multi-sport events in Africa
Sports competitions in Lagos
1977 in multi-sport events
1977 in African sport
20th century in Lagos
1977 in Nigerian sport